Eika is an island in the southern part of Ulstein Municipality in Møre og Romsdal county, Norway.  It is connected to the village of Eiksund on the island of Hareidlandet by the Eiksund Bridge.  Eika is connected to the mainland of Norway by the Eiksund Tunnel.

There are only a few permanent residents on the island. The island was part of Herøy Municipality until 1964.

See also
List of islands of Norway

References

Ulstein
Islands of Møre og Romsdal